The Aquatic Sports Association of Malta is the governing body of swimming, and water polo in Malta.  It is affiliated with both LEN, FINA and COMEN.

External links
ASA Malta official website

Malta
Sports governing bodies in Malta
Swimming in Malta